The Sapporo International Ski Marathon is a cross-country skiing marathon in Japan. It has been held since 1981 and is part of Worldloppet since 1985.

References

External links
 Official website

Ski marathons
1981 establishments in Japan
Cross-country skiing competitions in Japan
February sporting events
Recurring sporting events established in 1981
Sports competitions in Sapporo